The PZL-101 Gawron (rook) is a Polish agricultural and utility aircraft designed and built by WSK-Okęcie (later PZL "Warszawa-Okęcie").

Design and development
The PZL-101 was a development of the Yakovlev Yak-12M, manufactured in Poland under licence from 1956. The main goal was to create an agricultural aircraft with increased useful load. Works were carried out by a team led by Stanisław Lassota. Behind two crew seats there was installed a container for 500 kg of chemicals, with a "hump" above a fuselage. Because a center of gravity moved rearwards, the plane was fitted with new, swept wings, with significant vertical end plates to improve air flow. Later, in most of the aircraft they were removed, because they increased side surface, making landing very tricky in crosswind. Main landing gear was also shifted rearwards, comparing with Yak-12. Equipment was also simplified and lightened to increase useful load, e.g. the right door was removed.

The first prototype flew on April 14, 1958, and the production of the PZL-101 started in 1960. From 1962 the PZL-101A variant was produced, with improved equipment, pilot's seat raised and a right-side door added. From 1965 a further improved PZL-101B was produced. Visible changes were: lack of "hump" above the fuselage and a bigger air intake below engine. Apart from agricultural planes, there were made four-seater utility planes and air ambulances. Until production end in 1968, 325 planes were manufactured, including 215 agricultural ones, 78 utility ones and 32 air ambulances.

Operational history
The main user of the PZL-101 was the Polish civilian aviation. Polish agricultural planes were used in Poland and in services abroad (Austria, Libya, Egypt). They were mostly replaced in this role in the late 1970s by the PZL-106 Kruk and PZL-Mielec M-18 Dromader. Air ambulances were used in the Polish civilian aviation. Utility Gawrons were used in aero clubs in the country, also for glider towing and parachute training (with removed right doors). In 2006 there remained 40 Gawrons in the Polish registry, including 4 private owned.

134 PZL-101s were exported, mainly to Hungary and Bulgaria, in lesser numbers to eight other countries.

On 30 March 2007 EADS PZL "Warszawa-Okęcie" S.A. announced that will not longer support their tasks related with flight certificates for Jak-12A, Jak-12M and PZL-101 Gawron. Between 31 March and 28 June 2007 Polish Civil Aviation Office was temporary certificate holder. Since 28 June PZL-101s can be used only as experimental aircraft class.

Description
Metal construction braced high-wing monoplane, conventional in layout. Fuselage of a steel frame, covered with duralumin (front) and canvas (tail). Two-spar wings, canvas covered, fitted with slotted flaps, slats and vertical edge plates. Two-seat or four-seat cabin. Conventional fixed landing gear with a tail wheel. In an agricultural variant there was 800-litre container in a fuselage (for 500 kg of chemicals), behind front seats, with exchangeable sets of equipment for spraying or cropdusting.

Single radial engine 9-cylinder AI-14R (cruise power 161 kW/220 hp, take-off power 191 kW/260 hp). Two-blade propeller. Two fuel tanks in wings, 90 L each.

Variants
PZL-101
First production series built between 1960 and 1962.
PZL-101A
Version with improved equipment and a right-side door added, built between 1962 and 1965.
PZL-101B
Improved version lacking of "hump" above the fuselage and with bigger air intake below engine, built between 1965 and 1968.

Operators
 received five aircraft.
 bought 40 aircraft.
 received three aircraft.
 bought 67 aircraft, 52 were delivered in agro variant.
 bought six aircraft.
 was the main operator, 191 aircraft were delivered.
 bought four aircraft.
 bought two aircraft.
 bought five aircraft.
 bought one aircraft.
 bought one aircraft.

Specifications

See also

References

Janusz Babiejczuk, Jerzy Grzegorzewski: Polski przemysł lotniczy 1945-1973 (Polish aviation industry...), Wydawnictwo MON, Warsaw 1974 (no ISBN)
 Taylor, John W. R. Jane's All The World's Aircraft 1965-66. London: Sampson Low, Marston, 1965.

External links

Official movie Samolot PZL 101A "Gawron". Przegląd przed lotem prepared by Pracownia filmu i foto Aeroklubu PRL.

1950s Polish civil utility aircraft
1950s Polish agricultural aircraft
PZL aircraft
Single-engined tractor aircraft
High-wing aircraft
Aircraft first flown in 1958